Roghan Nabati Sari Football Club was an Iranian football club based in Sari, Iran. They  played in the 2nd Division 2000/01.

Football clubs in Iran